This is a list of active Estonian Navy ships. In total there are 6 commissioned ships in the navy.

Ships

References

Active 
Lists of ships by country
Lists of currently active military vehicles